Virginia Hammond (August 20, 1893 – April 6, 1972) was an American film and theatre actress.

Born in Staunton, Virginia. Hammond was the daughter of a Confederate army major.

Hammond began her career in 1907, where she made her theatre debut in the Broadway play, titled, John the Baptist. She continued her career, mainly appearing on theatre, in which her credits includes, Our American Cousin, The Famous Mrs. Fair, Tumble In, What's Your Husband Doing?, The Man Who Came to Dinner, Arsene Lupin, What the Doctor Ordered and Desert Sands, among others. Her final theatre credit was from the Broadway play, titled, Craig's Wife, in which she played the role of "Mrs. Frazier", in 1947.

Hammond then began her film career in 1916, when she appeared in the silent film Vultures of Society, in which she played the role of "Mrs. Upperwon". In her film career, Hammond starred and co-starred in films, such as, Anybody's Woman, The Great Impersonation, The Virginia Judge, The Kiss, Charlie Chan's Courage and Chandu the Magician. Her final credit was from 1936 film Romeo and Juliet, in which she played the role of "Lady Montague.

She was actress Edna May Oliver's best friend.

Hammond died in April 1972 in Washington, D.C., at the age of 78. She was buried in Fort Lincoln Cemetery.

References

External links 

Rotten Tomatoes profile

1893 births
1972 deaths
People from Staunton, Virginia
Actresses from Virginia
American film actresses
American stage actresses
American silent film actresses
20th-century American actresses
Burials in Washington (state)